Kimberly Alexis "Kim" Boulos (born 16 April 1987) is a Haitian women's association football player who plays as a midfielder for  Bollstanäs in Sweden.

College career
Boulos played collegiate soccer for the Fordham Rams and the South Carolina Gamecocks.

Boulos has totaled 16 goals from 2007-08 at Fordham, which is tied for tenth all-time at Rose Hill. She was a two-time All-Atlantic 10 selection (First Team – 2008; Second Team – 2007), a two-time All-Northeast Region pick (NSCAA Second Team – 2007; Soccer Buzz Magazine All-Northeast – 2008), and an Academic All-Atlantic 10 honoree (2008).

International career
Boulos debuted for the Haiti women's national football team in 2010.

Personal
Boulos was born in Croton, New York to John and Gia Boulos. Her grandfather was footballer John "Frenchy" Boulos who was born in Haiti, is in the National Soccer Hall of Fame.

References

External links 
 

1987 births
Living people
Citizens of Haiti through descent
Haitian women's footballers
Women's association football midfielders
Haiti women's international footballers
Competitors at the 2014 Central American and Caribbean Games
Haitian people of Lebanese descent
Haitian expatriate footballers
Haitian expatriate sportspeople in Sweden
Expatriate women's footballers in Sweden
Soccer players from New York (state)
American women's soccer players
South Carolina Gamecocks women's soccer players
Fordham Rams women's soccer players
American sportspeople of Haitian descent
American people of Lebanese descent
Sportspeople of Lebanese descent
American expatriate women's soccer players
American expatriate sportspeople in Sweden